Lepidocaryeae is a tribe of plants in the family Arecaceae. Subtribes and genera in the tribe are:

Subtribe Ancistrophyllinae – Africa
Oncocalamus – Central Africa
Eremospatha – Africa
Laccosperma – Africa
Subtribe Raphiinae
Raphia – Africa, Madagascar, parts of South America
Subtribe Mauritiinae – northern South America
Lepidocaryum – central Amazon basin
Mauritia – northern South America
Mauritiella – northern South America

See also 
 List of Arecaceae genera

References

External links 

 
Monocot tribes